Kasman Singodimedjo (25 February 1904 – 25 October 1982) was an Indonesian nationalist, politician, and National Hero who served as the second Attorney General of Indonesia between November 1945 and May 1946, and as the first chairman of the Central Indonesian National Committee (KNIP) in 1945.

Born near Purworejo to a Muslim family, Kasman was educated in colonial schools before enrolling at the STOVIA medical school and the Batavia Law School. Graduating from the latter, he worked as a teacher before joining the Japanese PETA militia during the Japanese occupation period. He then participated in the Preparatory Committee for Indonesian Independence, lobbying other Muslim leaders to compromise in favor of national unity. After the proclamation of Indonesian independence in August 1945, he served as chairman of KNIP for two months before joining Masyumi and being appointed attorney general in November. He then became a legislator and participated in the Constitutional Assembly of Indonesia where he endorsed Islam as the basis of the Indonesian state. He was then arrested for supporting Masyumi leaders involved in the Revolutionary Government of the Republic of Indonesia and imprisoned, with another imprisonment in 1963 under charges of conspiracy against the state. Shortly before his death in 1982, Kasman would take part in petitions criticizing Suharto's government. He was made a National Hero in 2018.

Early life and career
Kasman was born near the town of Purworejo, today in Central Java, on 25 February 1904. He was the third of seven children, although three of his siblings died in infancy. His father was a local Islamic functionary. He was educated at a Hollandsch-Inlandsche School (Dutch school for natives), continuing to a Meer Uitgebreid Lager Onderwijs (MULO) middle school and then to the STOVIA medical school in Batavia. During his time at STOVIA's preparatory school, Kasman was elected chairman of the Jong Islamieten Bond, the Muslim youth organization, and he held this position between 1930 and 1935. He did not complete his studies at STOVIA and instead enrolled at the Rechtshogeschool te Batavia (Batavia Law School/RHS), graduating with a law degree in 1934. He continued his education at the RHS until he obtained a doctorate in sociology and economics in 1939.

Kasman began to teach at various schools, both those affiliated with the colonial government and with Muhammadiyah, after his graduation from RHS. For some time, he was imprisoned by Dutch authorities after he gave a public speech in 1940 calling for Indonesian independence. In 1941, he worked as an agricultural consultant for the colonial government. Following the Japanese invasion and takeover of the Dutch East Indies, Kasman was recruited into the occupational militia Pembela Tanah Air (PETA) and was appointed a battalion commander. On the eve of the proclamation of Indonesian independence, Kasman was the commander of PETA in Jakarta, although he was in Bandung when nationalist leaders Sukarno and Mohammad Hatta were kidnapped by youths. Due to his absence, PETA in Jakarta did not take any action against or in aid of the youths.

Political career
Following the proclamation of Indonesian independence, Kasman along with several Indonesian collaborationist leaders were invited to informally join the Preparatory Committee for Indonesian Independence (PPKI) on 18 August, where Kasman and the others' positions were attacked by nationalist youths who considered them too close to the Japanese. On the same day, his lobbying of hardline Muslims such as  allowed the revocation of a clause implementing sharia law to Muslims in the country. Although Kasman supported the clause, he believed that it was more crucial at that time to create national unity, and intended to implement the clause back into law at a later time upon the formation of a national parliament which was expected to convene in six months. The following day, the leaders formally requested the dissolution of PETA, although Kasman was appointed into a planning committee for an Indonesian national defence force. 

After PPKI's dissolution and the formation of the Central Indonesian National Committee (KNIP) on 29 August 1945, Kasman was appointed as its inaugural chairman. In the KNIP's second plenary session on 16–17 October, however, Kasman was criticized for inaction by pemuda (youth) representatives. He was also accused of allowing soldiers under his command to be disarmed by Japanese troops while he commanded PETA in Jakarta. Kasman was removed from his chairmanship on 16 October, with Adam Malik temporarily taking his seat until Sutan Sjahrir was elected the following day. In November 1945, following the formation of the Masyumi political party, Kasman was appointed as a deputy chairman in its inaugural leadership.

Kasman was also briefly Attorney General of Indonesia, serving between November 1945 and May 1946. During his brief tenure, he issued an announcement to regional leaders, attorneys and police officers calling for the implementation of the "rule of law through quick and fair trials". Kasman also endorsed the call by Islamic guerilla leaders such as Kartosuwiryo for a jihad against the Dutch during his time in office. In the aftermath of a Dutch military offensive in 1947, Masyumi which had previously been part of the opposition agreed to join a unity government under prime minister Amir Sjarifuddin, and Kasman was appointed as junior minister for justice on 11 November 1947. This arrangement did not last long, as the cabinet was disbanded on 23 January the following year due to general opposition to the Renville Agreement. At one point during the revolution, he made a trip to Europe to study military tribunals there.

During the liberal democracy period in the 1950s, Kasman became a member of the Provisional People's Representative Council and the Constitutional Assembly of Indonesia. Within the Assembly, Kasman chaired an ad hoc preparatory committee which put forward recommendations on a new constitution and state philosophy, but beyond this, the Assembly made little progress. This deadlock was at large due to disagreements between a nationalist faction and an Islamist faction on the basis of the state. During debates in the Assembly, Kasman would quote and interpret the Quran, drawing his conclusion that the Indonesian Islamic community should be required to implement Islam as the basis of the state.

In 1958, with many Masyumi leaders being involved in the subversive Revolutionary Government of the Republic of Indonesia, Masyumi split over the question of denouncing said leaders. Kasman himself supported the rebelling leaders such as Mohammad Natsir. Shortly afterwards, Kasman gave a speech in Magelang which resulted in his arrest by authorities. Authorities claimed that his speech was in support of the rebels, although Kasman accused a journalist of misreporting his speech. He was sentenced to three years' prison in 1960. He was again arrested on 9 November 1963 under charges of conspiracy against the state and of plotting to assassinate Sukarno, and the following year was sentenced to another eight years in prison (reduced to two and a half years upon appeal).

Later life and death
During Suharto's presidency, Kasman remained a critic of the government. In 1980, he signed two petitions – one (the Petition of Fifty) attacking the content of Suharto's speeches, and another criticizing the conduct of elections. Kasman was the first signatory of the latter petition, which was also known as the "Kasman Petition". He also remained active in politics, campaigning although not running for the 1977 Indonesian legislative election.

Kasman died on the evening of 25 October 1982 after receiving nine months of treatment for prostate cancer at the Jakarta Islamic Hospital. His body was buried at the Tanah Kusir Cemetery. In 1992, when the Suharto goverrnment distributed awards to former members of PPKI, Kasman was bypassed and did not receive an award. Later on, after the fall of Suharto, Kasman was declared a National Hero of Indonesia in 2018 by president Joko Widodo.

References

Footnotes

Citations

Bibliography
 
 
 

1904 births
1982 deaths
Indonesian Muslims
Members of the People's Representative Council, 1950
People from Purworejo Regency
Masyumi Party politicians
Government ministers of Indonesia
Attorneys General of Indonesia
Rechtshogeschool te Batavia alumni
National Heroes of Indonesia
Muhammadiyah
STOVIA alumni